The Genovesa ground finch (Geospiza acutirostris) is a small bird native to the Galápagos Islands. It was considered a subspecies of the sharp-beaked ground finch (Geospiza difficilis) endemic to Genovesa Islands. The International Ornithologists' Union has split the species. Other taxonomic authorities still consider it conspecific.

References

Genovesa ground finch
Endemic birds of the Galápagos Islands
Genovesa ground finch
Taxa named by Robert Ridgway